Erich Sackmann (born 26 November 1934) is a German experimental physicist and a pioneer of biophysics in Europe.

Career
Sackmann obtained his MSc (1961) and PhD (1964) degrees from the University of Stuttgart in the group of Theodor Förster. He then spent two years at Bell Telephone Laboratories in Murray Hill, New Jersey, and six years at Max Planck Institute for Biophysical Chemistry in Göttingen, Germany. Between 1974 and 1980 he was professor of physics and head of the biophysics department at Universität Ulm, and from 1980 until retirement in 2003 he held the same positions at the Physics Department of the Technical University of Munich.

Sackmann dedicated a lifetime of research towards probing the living cell with tools of physics, long before biophysics was the mode of the day. Considered as a father of biophysics in Europe, he pioneered, along with others,  the idea of a “bottom up” approach towards understanding the cell – starting from relatively simple systems like lipid bilayers, giant vesicles and actin in solution and going towards more and more complex systems to reach eventually an understanding at the level of the entire cell.

More than 200 publications and several books Literatur von und über Erich Sackmann testify to his contributions to soft matter and biophysics. His early work was mainly on lyotropic liquid crystals and lipid membranes. Later, along with his students he laid the foundations of our current understanding of membrane adhesion. Over the years, his team developed and improved the technique of reflection interference contrast microscopy – RICM (which is quantitative interference reflection microscopy – IRM)  – a powerful tool to probe adhesion of membranes and thin films. Collaborations with theoreticians like Reinhard Lipowsky, Udo Seifert and Robijn Bruinsma have led to seminal works on adhesion of cell mimetic giant vesicles (also called liposomes).

Another of his interests is the cytoskeleton and its dynamics. To study cytoskeletal dynamics, his team developed magnetic tweezers capable of exerting very small pulling forces. He has contributed to our understanding of the dynamics of single actin filaments, actin networks as well as intact living cells.

His research interests include: physics of self assembly and function of artificial and biological membranes, viscoelastic microscopy of cells, physics of the actin based cytoskeleton: micro-rheology of macromolecular networks, applications of solid-supported lipid-protein membranes, ultrathin hydrated polymer layers and polymer/membrane composite films and neutron Reflectivity as a new tool to study the self assembly of membrane associated proteins.

Along with Reinhard Lipowsky, he has authored "the Structure and Dynamics of Membranes". Recently, along with Rudolf Merkel, he has published "Lehrbuch der Biophysik" – a text book on biophysics aimed at students and researchers.

He was elected a  Fellow of the American Physical Society in 2002.  In recognition of his research work, in 2006, he was awarded the Stern-Gerlach-Medal by the  DPG, German Physical Society.

See also
Lipid raft

References

1934 births
German biophysicists
Living people
Scientists at Bell Labs
Academic staff of the Technical University of Munich
Academic staff of the University of Ulm
Fellows of the American Physical Society